Bradley J. Bondi is an American lawyer, law professor and partner at Cahill Gordon & Reindel, where he is the Chair of the firm's White Collar and Government Investigations Practice Group. He has also served on the executive staff of the Securities and Exchange Commission (SEC) and he was appointed to the Financial Crisis Inquiry Commission (FCIC) in the wake of the 2007-2008 financial crisis to investigate its causes.

He appears regularly as a legal analyst and commentator on television, including CNBC and Bloomberg Television, and is often quoted in the Wall Street Journal, the New York Times, The Washington Post,  Forbes and others.

Bondi has provided expert Congressional testimony on securities law enforcement and is a senior fellow at the Center for Financial Stability, a think tank focusing on domestic and international securities and banking regulation, financial markets, corporate governance and the financial crisis. He is also a member of the board of advisors of the Economic Crime and Cybersecurity Institute, which supports education and research in economic crime and information security.

Career

Education 
Bondi received a B.S. degree with highest honors in finance, an M.B.A. in finance and management and a J.D. with highest honors from the University of Florida Levin College of Law. He earned an L.L.M. with distinction in Securities and Financial Regulations from Georgetown University Law Center where he received the Thomas Bradbury Chetwood, S.J. Prize for best academic record in his class. He also holds a Certificate in Executive Leadership from Cornell University and a Certificate in Management Excellence from Harvard Business School.

Upon graduation from law school, he clerked for Judge Edward E. Carnes of the U.S. Court of Appeals for the Eleventh Circuit.

In 2021, Bondi established and endowed a diversity and inclusion scholarship at the University of Florida College of Law.

Government Service 
Bondi served three years on the executive staff of the Securities and Exchange Commission, working as counsel for enforcement actions and regulatory rule-making to Commissioners Paul S. Atkins and Troy Paredes,  the former of whom Bondi has co-authored op-eds and journal articles on regulatory policy and securities law.  While at the SEC, he served as a Special Assistant United States Attorney.

In the wake of the financial crisis, Bondi was appointed from the SEC to the Financial Crisis Inquiry Commission (FCIC), as an assistant director and deputy general counsel.  The Commission was signed into law in 2009 and charged with examining “the causes, domestic and global, of the current financial and economic crisis in the United States." While with the FCIC, Bondi led one of the three teams examining the causes of the financial crisis,  and questioned prominent figures in the financial world including Warren Buffett, former Chairman and CEO of Citigroup Charles Prince, former US Secretary of the Treasury Robert Rubin, former Citigroup executive John Reed, hedge fund manager William Ackman, then-CEO of Citigroup Vikram Pandit, Eric Kolchinsky, Thomas Maheras and David Bushnell.  He has been credited with assisting Peter Wallison, a commissioner of the Financial Crisis Inquiry Commission, with research that went into Wallison's dissenting report.

Private Sector 
Securities Docket called Bondi “the first choice among Boards of Directors and Audit Committees of the Fortune 500 when their company is faced with SEC or DOJ problems” and Law360 named Bondi a White Collar MVP in 2019, 2021 and 2022. The National Law Journal in 2020 named him a "Washington, DC Trailblazer" to recognize his significant contributions to the field of securities law. Today, Bondi represents companies, boards of directors and prominent individuals in significant legal crises such as enforcement actions involving the SEC and the Department of Justice (DOJ), internal investigations and significant litigation. He is the Chair of Cahill's White Collar and Government Investigations Practice Group.

Among his notable clients that are public, Bondi led the representation of Tesla before the SEC in an enforcement case stemming from tweets by its CEO concerning a potential going-private transaction in 2018. The Wall Street Journal described the SEC action as, "Among the highest-profile cases in years."

Bondi also led an internal investigation for the board of directors of the Washington Metropolitan Area Transit Authority that exposed misconduct by a prominent D.C. Council Member.  The Washington Post said the "devastating" and “meticulous report cited incontrovertible evidence” of misconduct. The paper credited the report for leading to the Council Member's re-election defeat, following his public reprimand.

Bondi defended the Salix subsidiary of Valeant Pharmaceuticals in a securities class action in 2017.  In 2018, Bondi defended Salix before the SEC in an enforcement action that resulted in no monetary penalties against the company. The SEC's press release stated that, "The settlement with Salix reflects the company's self-report to the Commission and its significant cooperation with the investigation." The SEC also acknowledged that, "Salix's proactive remediation included conducting an extensive internal investigation that led to [the CFO's] resignation."

In 2016, Bondi represented Princess Cruise Lines in connection with a criminal case involving the illegal discharge from one of its ships.

Bondi successfully represented the investment bank Morgan Stanley before the Supreme Court of the United States, in the case Credit Suisse First Boston Ltd. v. Billing (interpreting securities laws as implicitly precluding the application of anti-trust laws in the IPO process). He also served as the counsel of record for three other Supreme Court amicus curiae briefs: Yates v. United States (construing Sarbanes-Oxley’s criminal provision for document destruction), Salman v. United States (concerning the personal benefit element of insider trading law) and Lui v. SEC, (limiting the SEC's disgorgement remedy to a defendant's net profits).

Bondi teaches securities law as an adjunct professor at Yale Law School, Georgetown University Law Center and George Mason University's Antonin Scalia Law School.

Publications 
Bondi has authored numerous academic articles on securities law, criminal law and corporate governance. He also has authored two book chapters on white-collar criminal defense strategy for the series Inside the Minds (Aspatore Books, 2007).  He serves as a regular contributor to Directorship Magazine, a publication of the National Association of Corporate Directors.

In 2018, he provided Congressional testimony concerning securities law enforcement.

Academic and Journal Articles 
 Corporate Secretary Guidelines: Taking Notes and Preparing Official Minutes, National Association of Corporate Directors Magazine (August 2016)
 When Should the General Counsel Recommend that the Board Conduct an Independent Investigation?, ACC Docket (June 2016)
 Surviving a Restatement:  Ten Pitfalls To Avoid, National Association of Corporate Directors Magazine (May 2016)
 Defending the Data: A Director's Cybersecurity Duty, National Association of Corporate Directors Magazine (March 2016)
 Gleaning Best FCPA Practices for Directors from Recent Government Actions, National Association of Corporate Directors Magazine (February 2016)
 Effective Communications During a Crisis, National Association of Corporate Directors Magazine (December 2015)
 Is the SEC Zeroing In On Directors?, National Association of Corporate Directors Magazine (November 2015)
 The Law of Insider Trading: Legal Theories, Common Defenses, and Best Practices for Ensuring Compliance, New York University Journal of Law and Business (March 2012)
 Facilitating Economic Recovery and Sustainable Growth through Reform of the Securities Class-Action System: Exploring Arbitration as an Alternative to Litigation, Harvard Journal of Law and Public Policy (Spring 2010)
 Don't Tread On Me: Has the United States Government's Quest for Customer Records from UBS Sounded the Death Knell for Swiss Bank Secrecy Laws?, Northwestern Journal of International Law & Business (Winter 2010)
 No Secrets Allowed: Congress's Treatment and Mistreatment of the Attorney-Client Privilege and the Work-Product Protection in Congressional Investigations and Contempt Proceedings, Journal of Law & Politics (March, 2010)
 Dangerous Liaisons: Collective Scienter in SEC Enforcement Actions, New York University Journal of Law and Business (Fall 2009)
 Securities Arbitrations Involving Mortgage-Backed Securities and Collateralized Mortgage Obligations: Suitable for Unsuitability Claims?, Fordham Journal of Corporate & Financial Law (August 22, 2009) 
 Evaluating the Mission: A Critical Review of the History and Evolution of the SEC Enforcement Program (co-authored with SEC Commissioner Paul S. Atkins), Fordham Journal of Corporate & Financial Law (2008)

References 

American lawyers
Living people
People associated with Cahill Gordon & Reindel
Warrington College of Business alumni
Georgetown University Law Center alumni
Georgetown University Law Center faculty
Year of birth missing (living people)
Fredric G. Levin College of Law alumni